Sébastien Renouard (born 11 July 1984) is a French former professional footballer who played as a midfielder.

Career 
Born in Nancy, Renouard began his career in the youth sides of FC Metz and before being promoted to the senior side in Ligue 1 in 2002. On 11 August 2009, Angers SCO signed the midfielder from FC Metz on a two-year deal. He went on to score four goals in 36 league appearances for Angers before joining Stade Lavallois in the summer of 2011. Renouard played 22 games for Laval during the 2011–12 season, scoring twice, but was released by the club at the end of the campaign.

References

External links
 
 

1984 births
Living people
French footballers
Association football midfielders
FC Metz players
Angers SCO players
Stade Lavallois players
CS Fola Esch players
Ligue 1 players
Ligue 2 players
French expatriate footballers
Expatriate footballers in Luxembourg